W Face (stylized as W FACE, pronounced as Double face) is a two-part studio album release by Japanese recording artist Koda Kumi. The albums were packaged separately under the sub-titles Inside and Outside, and distributed on March 8, 2017 by Rhythm Zone and through digital retails stores by Avex Music Creative Inc. Production on both collections started in early-2016 when she finished her concert tour for Walk of My Life (2015), and launched the campaign with the promotional recording "Shhh!". Furthermore, the singer returns as the album's primary and only songwriter while collaborating with a variety of foreign and international composers and producers.

Stylistically, W Face serves as a concept album and delve into two personal sides of the singer: Inside deals with emotional themes, while Outside portrays an aggressive and uptempo approach. Commercially, both records experienced success in Japan. Outside became Kumi's ninth studio album, and twelfth overall, to top the Oricon Albums Chart, while Inside opened one position behind. In order to promote the album, some tracks from each album were released prior to the album's distribution. She included several tracks from Outside on her remix album, Driving Hit's 7, which was released a month later, and began her Live Tour 2017 ~W Face~ on April 7.

W Face: Inside

W Face: Inside (stylized as W FACE ~inside~ and pronounced as Double face: Inside) is the joint 13th studio album by Koda Kumi, and was released on March 8, 2017 by Rhythm Zone and through digital retails via Avex Music Creative Inc. The record was published in three physical formats: a stand-alone CD, a CD+DVD edition and a CD+Blu-ray combination pack. The first disc featured 10 original recordings — all solely written by Kumi herself — while the bundle sets include six music videos. These clips were spread on both the Inside and Outside albums. Along with the announcement, the images of each artwork were published in late January that year that show two faces of Kumi: Inside features her baring a "mild" expression, and each format slightly changes. The album was made for pre-order in mid-February, and first-press editions came with a cardboard sleeve and a bonus poster, which were made available at online carriers, including CD Japan and YesAsia.

Musically, Inside focuses on pop ballads and acoustic arrangements, and lyrically delve into her "softer" and more emotional side. In an interview with Billboard Japan, the singer stated that the musical approach of the album was primarily J-pop and contemporary pop music. The singer revealed a variety of different themes within the tracks to Inside. The album opener, "Bridget Song", discusses the hardship of women, while "Promise You" expresses universal love between family, friends and lovers. Kumi had also stated that Inside was harder to produce in comparison to Outside, because she wanted "to work on new material" after the latter record, and felt it was appropriate to release two records within 2017. There were two collaborations on the record: Japanese singer Chara, who co-composed the track "My Fun", which is placed as the closing number to the album, and "Bring It On," which was written, composed and performed by Back-On. Kumi had previously worked with Back-On for her 2011 song "Poppin' love cocktail." Kumi's husband, Kenji03, is also the lead vocalist of the group.

Reception
Inside experienced moderate success in Japan. The album entered at #2 on the daily Oricon Albums Chart, having been stalled from the top spot by Outside. The former opened with 11,812 copies sold. Additionally, it stayed at the same position for another two days. Based on a six-day statistic, Inside debuted at the same position on the weekly chart with 20,157 units sold, making it Kumi's first record to not chart atop of the weekly chart (due to Outside obtaining that position). However, it resulted in being her lowest first-week sales for a studio album. Inside opened at number six on their digital chart, one of Kumi's first appearances there since its establishment in September 2016. It shifted 1,207 units.

Singles and promotion
Three tracks from the album were used as promotional recordings, released prior to the albums distribution. "Kimi Omoi" was originally taken as a song from her mini-album Fever: Legend Live, and also came with a music video; however, the visual was not added to the album's DVD/Blu-ray track list. The song was originally released on the mini-album as a special for SANKYO's pachinko game, but later received a wide release. "Bridget Song" and "Yorokobi no Kakera" were published as digital download tracks before Inside was released, but only the former song received a music video. "Promise You" received an accompanying clip that had her in a small room filled with fairy lights.

In order to promote the album, Kumi performed some tracks on various television shows. "Bring it On", a tune from the studio release, was first performed during Kumi's second fan club tour, Let's Party Vol.2, which was later put on the second DVD of her eleventh studio album Bon Voyage. The song was used as the official campaign number to Japan's professional football league Sagan Tosu. She appeared on Utacon on January 31 and Music Fair on February 25, where she sung "On My Way", the theme song to the Japanese television series Mahiru no Akuma  (2017). She also promoted the track "Promise You" on Good Time Music and Utacon in mid-March 2017.

Kumi began a nationwide tour titled Koda Kumi Live Tour 2017 ~W Face~, which began on April 8 and concluded in January the following year.

Track listing

Charts and certifications

Japanese charts

Certifications and sales

|-
! scope="row"| Japan (RIAJ)
| 
| 27,900
|-
! scope="row"| Japan (RIAJ)
| 
| 1,200 
|-

W Face: Outside

W Face: Outside (stylized as W FACE ~outside~, pronounced as Double face: Outside) is the joint 13th studio album by Koda Kumi, and was released on March 8, 2017 by Rhythm Zone and through digital retails via Avex Music Creative Inc. The record was published in three physical formats: a stand-alone CD, a CD+DVD combo and a CD+Blu-ray bundle set. The first disc featured 10 original recordings — all solely written by Kumi herself — while the bundle sets include six music videos. The videos are spread on both the Inside and Outside albums. Along with the announcement, the images of each artwork were published in late January that year that show two faces of Koda Kumi: Outside features her baring an "aggressive" expression, with the shot being set in black-and-white tone and each format slightly changes. The album was made for pre-order in mid-February, and first-press editions came with a cardboard sleeve and a bonus poster, which were made available at CD Japan and YesAsia.

Musically, Outside focuses on "Western music", which Kumi describes as a conjunction of hip-hop, R&B, dance and rock music, and lyrically delve into her "aggressive" and more uptempo personality. The title track, "W Face", references both Inside and Outside in its lyrics, while tracks like "Bassline", "Ultraviolet" and "Wicked Girls" express a various depiction of women, both in past and present circumstances. Additionally, the album songs "Insane" and "Bassline" both incorporate freestyle rapping. Outside was the first one of both albums to be produced and completed for release, but Kumi stalled the release in order to create Inside and release them as two-part records.

The album also features rap artist AKLO from One Year War Music for the song "Cupcake". AKLO is most famous for his songs "Red Pill" and "RGTO," as well as his album The Arrival, which was ranked as the "best album of the year" on iTunes in 2014.

Reception
Outside experienced moderate success in Japan. The album entered at #1 on the daily Oricon Albums Chart, continuing her streak of number-one albums, which began in 2005 with her release of her first compilation album, Best ~first things~. It opened with 11,830 copies sold. It remained at the same position for another two days. Based on a six-day statistic, Outside debuted at the same position on the weekly chart with 20,246 units sold, making it Kumi's ninth studio album, and thirteenth overall, to reach number-one. However, it resulted in being her lowest-selling number-one debut, and essentially her lowest first-week sales for a studio album, the largest drop being Inside. Conversely, Outside opened one position lower than the predecessor album at number seven on Oricon's digital chart, one of Kumi's first appearances there since its establishment in September 2016. It shifted 1,095 units.

Singles and promotion
"Shhh!" was the album's only physical single release, which was published on April 16, 2016, and was her 59th single. The single was released for a limited time through mu-mo, and was available at concert venues for her Live Tour 2016 ~Best Single Collection~. Shhh! received four editions, three of which were only available at concert venues. Each edition contained different cover art and, much like her 12 Single Collection in 2005–2006, a different back cover, which, when put together, would reveal a hidden image. The CD contained the title track and "Kimi Omoi," which was previously released in 2014 on her limited Fever: Legend Live EP, along with its corresponding music video.
	
Another unique aspect to the single was that it was Kumi's first single to not be released with a jewel case. Each CD was released in a cardboard covered booklet. Also available for those who signed up at SP Music, a barcode was given to those who purchased the CD with a special code to download the song via mobile.

Additionally, two more tracks from W Face ~outside~ were used as promotional recordings: "Ultraviolet" and "Wicked Girls". Released as digital-only packages, both songs received music videos and appeared on the DVD/Blu-ray versions of Outside.

Two more entries to the album were shot as visuals: "Bassline" and "Insane". In order to promote the album, Kumi performed some tracks on various television shows. She promoted the song "Ultraviolet" on Good Time Music and Utacon in mid-March 2017.

A selection from Outside was also remixed and re-produced for her remix album Driving Hit's 7, which was released a month later on April 6. Kumi also started her Koda Kumi Live Tour 2017 ~W Face~ the same day.

Track listing

Charts and certifications

Japanese charts

Certifications and sales

|-
! scope="row"| Japan (RIAJ)
| 
| 28,000
|-
! scope="row"| Japan (RIAJ)
| 
| 1,000 
|-

References

External links
 Koda Kumi Official Site Retrieved February 25, 2017

2017 albums
Koda Kumi albums
Avex Group albums